Morceaux de fantaisie (French for Fantasy Pieces; , Pyesy Fantazii), Op. 3, is a set of five piano solo pieces composed by Sergei Rachmaninoff in 1892. The title reflects the pieces' imagery rather than their musical form, as none are actual fantasies. The set was dedicated to Anton Arensky, his harmony teacher at the Conservatory.

Composition

Elegie in E minor 

Elegie (Элегия, Elegiya) is a musical elegy at moderato tempo.

Prelude in C minor 

The second piece, Prelude (Прелюдия, Prelyudiya) is undoubtedly the most famous of the set.

Melody in E major 

Melody (Мелодия, Melodiya) is a short piece played Adagio sostenuto.  It was rewritten by Rachmaninoff in 1940, along with the Serenade.

Polichinelle in F minor 

The fourth piece, called Polichinelle (Полишинель, Polishinyelʹ), is in an ambiguous key although often referred to as "in F minor" (the F minor triad has never been established throughout), and played Allegro vivace. It is a character piece, based on the Commedia dell'arte character Pulcinella (Polichinelle is the French translation of this word) from which Punch (from Punch and Judy) derives. It is in ternary form (ABA), beginning and ending with a fast section that gives way to a slower, lyrical melodious passage in the middle.

Serenade in B minor 
The set ends with Serenade (Серенада, Serenada). It was rewritten by Rachmaninoff in 1940, along with the Melodie in E major. In several places, the key is in B Dorian mode instead of B minor.

External links 
  Sheet music available at the International Music Score Library Project
 Piano.ru - Sheet music download

Compositions for solo piano
Piano music by Sergei Rachmaninoff
1892 compositions
Rachmaninoff